Ivan Olegovich Podolyak (born 4 October 1990) is a Russian professional association football player.

Club career
He made his Russian Football National League debut for FC Avangard Kursk on 23 August 2007 in a game against FC Ural Yekaterinburg.

External links
 
 

1990 births
Sportspeople from Kursk
Living people
Russian footballers
Association football midfielders
Association football forwards
FC Shinnik Yaroslavl players
FC Avangard Kursk players
FC Zenit-Izhevsk players
FC Chayka Peschanokopskoye players